The Republic of Peščenica (Croatian: Republika Peščenica) was a satirical-parodical project of Croatian Željko Malnar named after the Zagreb neighbourhood of Peščenica.

Events were aired on anti-TV-show Nightmare Stage (Noćna mora), on Saturdays from 22:00 until the early morning hours on Z1, and transmitted via satellite. Events were described in short version in Malnar's column in the Globus magazine from Zagreb.

For a short period of time, shortened (and censored) versions of previous shows were aired on Croatian national TV in May 2007 (as "Privremeni tjednik"; only five episodes).

It was located in Peščenica, a working-class neighbourhood in Zagreb.
The neighbourhood is in the northern part of the city (northwards from Sava river), southeastwards from the city center.

The project ended with the end of the TV-Show in 2010 after the "minister of defense", Zvonimir Levačić, died.

Anthem is Peščenice bijela and Danijela.
Željko Malnar & Soma Dollara: Dobro jutro, Peščenico.

Presidents 
 Željko Malnar (1944 - 2013) (3 October 1992 - 9 July 2013)
 Sead Hasanović - Braco (1953 - Present) (9 July 2013 - Present)

Personalities 

 Željko Malnar, the President
 Zvonimir Levačić - Ševa, Minister of Defense

Cultural manifestations 
 Dora Noćna mora, song contest (parody on Croatian Eurovision qualification contest Dora; name is rhyming, made of Dora and Noćna mora, title of the TV-show)

Famous actions 
 Voluntary surrender and extradition of Malnar's generals and ministers to The Hague and ICTY ("You go there, so I don't have to go."), a parody on the same events from reality.
 R. Peščenica's (military) returning of Savudrijska vala and giving it back to Croatia ("Because our friendly neighbor Croatia doesn't have balls to do it herself."). Parody on Croatian-Slovenian border dispute about Savudrijska vala (Bay of Savudrija).
 Involving Peščenican personalities into Croatian political life (elections).

Literature 
Željko Malnar: Filozofija Republike Peščenice, Birotisak, Zagreb, 2004.,

References

External links 
 Noćna mora
 Index.hr Junaci Malnarove ulice na HTV-u - Showbiz - XMag
 Online TV-edition
 Index.hr Kurcolovcem i generalom Prkačinom na njemačke pljačkaše i goste u studiju (Braco, Jajan and Malnar are in the top picture)
 Javno Snalažljivi predsjednik: Malnar nažicao Mercedese od ruskog tajkuna
 Vjesnik Opet zakazala organizacija Mesićeva stožera (Mesić, Malnar and gas supply)
 Vjesnik Malnar grdi Hrvatsku i Hrvate, jer želi da im bude bolje i ljepše, želi ih popraviti, nema mržnje

Culture in Zagreb